Martín Nicolás Rechimuzzi (born 23 June 1987) is an Argentine comedian, actor, political scientist and content creator. He gained recognition for creating Minister Patricia and President Handel – fictional characters in reference to Patricia Bullrich and Mauricio Macri.

Early life
Martín Nicolás Rechimuzzi was born on 23 June 1987. He grew up in Caseros, Buenos Aires. He studied political science at the University of Buenos Aires.

Personal life
In an interview in 2018 he said that he considers himself a feminist but not a militant because "I am not the political subject to carry out that militancy."

In an interview in Anfibia LGBT podcast Fuera de margen, Rechimuzzi said that he doesn't consider himself heterosexual and that he doesn't believe much in "static categories".

Filmography

Theatre

References

External links
 
 
 

1987 births
21st-century comedians
21st-century Argentine male actors
21st-century political scientists
Argentine columnists
Argentine male comedians
Argentine male stage actors
Argentine male television actors
Argentine political scientists
Argentine YouTubers
Comedy-related YouTube channels
Comedy YouTubers
Feminist comedians
Living people
Male feminists
People from Tres de Febrero Partido
Political comedy
Prank calling
Prank YouTubers
Spanish-language YouTubers
University of Buenos Aires alumni
Vlogs-related YouTube channels
YouTube channels launched in 2013
YouTube vloggers
Place of birth missing (living people)